(), is one of the six letters the Arabic alphabet added to the twenty-two inherited from the Phoenician alphabet (the others being , , ,).
Its numerical value is 800 (see Abjad numerals).

In Modern Standard Arabic and many dialects, it represents an "emphatic" , and it might be pronounced as a pharyngealized voiced alveolar stop , pharyngealized voiced dental stop  or velarized voiced dental stop .

Origin
Based on ancient descriptions of this sound, it is clear that in Qur'anic Arabic ḍ was some sort of unusual lateral sound. Sibawayh, author of the first book on Arabic grammar, explained the letter as being articulated from "between the first part of the side of the tongue and the adjoining molars". The affricated form is suggested by loans of ḍ into Akkadian as ld or lṭ and into Malaysian as dl. However, not all linguists agree on this; the French orientalist André Roman supposes that the letter was actually a voiced emphatic alveolo-palatal sibilant , similar to the Polish ź.

This is an extremely unusual sound, and led the early Arabic grammarians to describe Arabic as the  lughat aḍ-ḍād "the language of the ḍād", since the sound was thought to be unique to Arabic. 
The emphatic lateral nature of this sound is possibly inherited from Proto-Semitic, and is compared to a phoneme in South Semitic languages such as Soqotri, but also in Mehri where it is usually an ejective lateral fricative. 

The letter itself is distinguished a derivation, by addition of a diacritic dot, from ص ṣād (representing /sˤ/).

Pronunciation

The standard pronunciation of this letter in modern Standard Arabic is the "emphatic" : pharyngealized voiced alveolar stop , pharyngealized voiced dental stop  or velarized voiced dental stop .

In most Bedouin influenced Arabic vernaculars  ḍād and  ẓāʾ have been merged quite early like in the varieties (such as Bedouin and Iraqi), where the dental fricatives are preserved, both the letters are pronounced . However, there are dialects in South Arabia and in Mauritania where both the letters are kept different but not in all contexts. In other vernaculars such as Egyptian  ḍād and  ẓāʾ contrast; but Classical Arabic ẓāʾ becomes , e.g. ʿaẓīm  (< Classical  ʿaḏ̣īm ) "great".

"De-emphaticized" pronunciation of both letters in the form of the plain  entered into other non-Arabic languages such as Persian, Urdu, Turkish. However, there do exist Arabic borrowings into Ibero-Romance languages as well as Hausa and Malay, where ḍād and ẓāʾ are differentiated.

Transliteration
 is transliterated as ḍ (D with underdot) in romanization. The combination ⟨dh⟩ is also sometimes used colloquially.

The Arabic letters   and   share the same Semitic origin with the Hebrew tsadi.

Unicode

See also
Arabic phonology

References

Arabic letters
Ge'ez language